Maize Craze was the game in the inaugural year, 1992, of the FIRST Robotics Competition.  This game was played by four individual robots trying to collect tennis balls into their starting base.  An impediment to the robots was that the entire playing field was covered in a layer of corn 1-2 inches thick.

Game overview

Field

The field was a 16' by 16' square piece of plywood 2.5 ft above the floor covered in a 1-2 inch thick layer of corn. The field's perimeter was rimmed with 8-inch high Plexiglas walls. The four home bases measured 20 inches square and were centered on each side of the field at its edge.

There were five posts on the field; one in each corner and one in the center. The center post was 12" tall and was capped by a 25-point tennis ball. Two diagonally opposed corner posts were 24" tall and capped by 10-point tennis balls. The remaining two posts were 36" tall and capped by 25-point tennis balls. 150 1-point tennis balls surround the center post.

25 feet above the floor was a structure to support the electrical umbilicals for the robots.

Scoring
In each match, four robots played individually to earn the highest score, starting in the four home bases. Each robot had 2 minutes to shepherd tennis balls into their home base. The robot with the highest score of balls in base at the end won. In the event of a tie, the robot that finished earlier won.

Robots
Robots were powered through 'umbilicals' hanging from the overhead beams and a 9 volt on-board "transistor radio" battery. The robots had to fit within a 38 cm by 50 cm by 34 cm box and weigh no more than 11 kg. The robots were each piloted by two high school student team members.

References

1992 in robotics
FIRST Robotics Competition games